A list of all international Tests played by the Malta national rugby union team. All data taken from maltarugby.com.

Rugby union in Malta